Bisley Camp railway station served the National Rifle Association in Bisley, Surrey, England, from 1890 to 1952 on Bisley Camp branch line.

History 
The station was opened on 14 July 1890 by the London and South Western Railway, although the first train stopped here on 12 July. It served the National Rifle Association facility when there was an annual meeting. It was relocated in 1891. There were no meetings from 1915 to 1918 so services were suspended. The War Office took over the station during the First World War and trained the troops at the nearby facility. After the war ended, it was returned to London and South Western Railway. Nearby were sidings and loops, which trains used to reverse out, and a level crossing. The station was still shown on the British Rail pamphlets in 1948. It was shown as Camp on the tickets. The last train was on 19 July 1952, although it was still used irregularly for military excursions.

References 

Disused railway stations in Surrey
Former London and South Western Railway stations
Railway stations in Great Britain opened in 1890
Railway stations in Great Britain closed in 1952
1890 establishments in England
1952 disestablishments in England